is a Japanese manga series written and illustrated by Marii Taiyou. It was serialized in Hakusensha's seinen manga magazine Young Animal from December 2016 to March 2020, with its chapters collected in seven tankōbon volumes. In North America, the manga was licensed for English release by Seven Seas Entertainment.

Premise
Home Economics teacher Shinji Yabe is asked to teach Miku Okazaki, the flashiest "gal" in their high school, to bake cookies in order to bribe her teachers from flunking her. With his encouragement, she eventually makes a successful batch. Shinji then starts a cooking club, but only Miku joins with some seemingly romantic intentions.

Characters
Shinji Yabe
A young high school Home Economics teacher. He worries that Miku might cross the line into a student-teacher romantic relationship. He starts a cooking club to try to increase his popularity among the high school students, but gets dismayed that Miku is the sole member.
Miku Okazaki
The flashiest gal in school, she has blonde hair and a voluptuous body, and is proud of it. At the beginning of the series, she is failing every subject. After seeing that Shinji pays attention to her, she enjoys hanging out with "Yabecchi", and flirts with him, hoping he will fall in love with her.
Makoto Ooishi
Miku's gal friend with the dark black hair
Hana Tsurubaya
Miku's gal friend with the brown hair and ponytail

Publication
Hakusensha collected its chapters in ten tankōbon volumes, released from June 29, 2017, to June 26, 2020.

In North America, the manga was licensed for English release by Seven Seas Entertainment.

Volume list

References

External links

Cooking in anime and manga
Gyaru in fiction
Hakusensha manga
Romantic comedy anime and manga
Seinen manga
Seven Seas Entertainment titles
Slice of life anime and manga